The year 1639 in music involved some significant events.

Events

Publications 
Agostino Agazzari – , Op. 21 (Rome: Vincenzo Blanco)
Francesco Corbetta – , a collection of guitar music, published in Bologna
Melchior Franck –  for eight voices (Coburg: Johann Eyrich), two funeral motets
Duarte Lobo – Second book of masses for four, five, and six voices (Antwerp: Balthasar Moreti for Plantin)
Alessandro Piccinini –  (Bologna: Giacomo Monti & Carlo Zenero), published posthumously by his son

Classical music 
Heinrich Schütz – Kleine geistliche Konzerte (Small Sacred Concertos), part 2

Opera 
Francesco Cavalli – Le nozze di Teti e di Peleo
Benedetto Ferrari – L'Armida
Marco Marazzoli and Virgilio Mazzocchi – Chi soffre, speri, libretto by Cardinal Giulio Rospigliosi (later Pope Clement IX), premièred in Rome
Claudio Monteverdi – Adone, premiéred in Venice

Births 
February 4 – Alessandro Melani, Italian composer (died 1703)
April 3 – Alessandro Stradella, Italian composer (killed 1682)

Deaths 
June 1 – Melchior Franck, composer (born 1579)
July – Carlo Farina, violinist, conductor and composer (born c.1600) (plague)
October 28 – Stefano Landi, composer and teacher (born 1587)

 
17th century in music
Music by year